Fudbalski klub Borac Kozarska Dubica (Serbian Cyrillic: Фудбалски клуб Борац Козарска Дубица) is a Bosnian football club from the city of Kozarska Dubica, Republika Srpska.
They have played in the First League of the Republika Srpska in season 1996–97, but were relegated to the Second League of the Republika Srpska in 1997 as a result of merger of East and West division of First League. In 2004, they were relegated to the Regional League. After many years of playing in regional and local leagues, in 2014 they were promoted back to the Second League, the 3rd level league competition in Bosnia and Herzegovina. In 2020, they were promoted back to the First League.

History

Origins 
Football club Borac was established in July 1936 at the initiative of leather workers of Dubica, Vrbas Banovina, Kingdom of Yugoslavia. Originally it was named Radnički sportski klub Borac, which in English language means Workers Sports Club 'Fighter' , and its roots come from the relation the club had with labour movements during the first half of the 20th century.

The founders were Ahmet Ćelam, Vujo Momčilović and Razim Hadžić, workers from Dubica. Players were mainly the workers, as well as poor youths without jobs. At that time, management and players were members of different faiths and nations who lived in the town.
Although he was in a weak financial position and performed in the lower ranks of the competition, the Borac was too popular among fellow citizens. 

Borac rallied progressive young people and members of the Communist Party. City authorities did not provide any help to the club because he was considered a "red club". On the contrary, they tried in every way to obstruct the Club activities because was considered an enemy of the social system. However, the Borac has managed to maintain a decent sports team.

Besides playing football and participating in the football league, the Borac administration organized mass trips and celebrations of May Day.

Club records

Best results 
 First League of the Republika Srpska
 10th place: 1996–97
 Second League of the Republika Srpska, West Division
 Runners-up (1): 1995–96
 Republika Srpska Cup
 Eighth-finals (2): 2001–02, 2016–17
 16th-finals (3): 2003–04, 2010–11, 2013–14
 RFA Prijedor Cup
 Winners (1): 2007

Players

Current squad

Notable players
List of players who represented FIFA international teams in International matches.

  Vlado Kotur
  Aleksandar Rodić
  Nemanja Trkulja

Historical list of managers 
  Goran Adžić (2013–2014)
  Željko Knežević (2014–)
  Zoran Bujić (2021–)

References

External links 
 History of FK Borac Kozarska Dubica
 2014–15 Second League of the Republika Srpska, West Division

Football clubs from Dubica, Bosnia and Herzegovina
Football clubs in Republika Srpska
Football clubs in Bosnia and Herzegovina
Association football clubs established in 1936
1936 establishments in Bosnia and Herzegovina